Boxer  is an Indian Bengali sports drama romantic film directed by Sanjoy Bardhan. Boxer is about a young boxer based in Kolkata. The film stars debutant Shikhar Srivastava and Ena Saha in the lead roles and was produced by Koushik K Roy, also known as Roy Koushik. The music was released through SVF Music.
It was heavily inspired by the 2016 Bollywood Film Do Lafzon Ki Kahani, which was itself based on the 2011 South Korean Film Always.

Plot 
The film is the story of an 18-year-old boxer, Rony, who has reached adulthood after making many mistakes, but must move on. The boxing ring is a metaphor for life; every hurt and injury is a lesson in life, as he strives to win not a trophy but his first love, Jinia.

Cast
 Shikhar Srivastava as Rony
 Ena Saha as Jinia
 Soumitra Chatterjee as Church Father 
 Rajatava Dutta as Digvijoy Sengupta
 Laboni Sarkar as Sanghamitra Sengupta
 Sudip Mukherjee as Boxing Coach
 Sudip Sarkar as Siddhartha Chowdhury
 Riya Bhattacharje  as Item Girl Dancer
 Samidh Mukerjee as Rock Singer
Dheeraj Shaji as Kiran

Soundtrack

The music for the film was composed by Samidh Mukerjee and Joy-Anjan. Akash Chakrabarty, Budhaditta and Samidh Mukherjee have written the lyrics for songs. "Du chokher Isharay" song composed by Joy-Anjan and penned by Budhaditta. The soundtrack was released by SVF Music. The full music album was released on 26 April 2017.

References

External links 
 
 

2018 films
Bengali-language Indian films
2010s Bengali-language films
Indian sports drama films
Indian boxing films
2010s sports drama films
Films set in West Bengal
2018 drama films